Soul at Peace is a 2009 drama film directed by Vladimír Balko and starring Attila Mokos, Roman Luknár and Helena Krajčiová. It was written by Czech writer Jiří Křižan. At the 2010 ceremony for the Sun in a Net Awards, the film won in five categories including Best Film, Best Leading Actor (Attila Mokos), Best Supporting Actor (Roman Luknár), Best Supporting Actress (Helena Krajčiová) and Best Cinematography (Martin Štrba). The film won the Best Narrative award at the 2010 Kansas International Film Festival. Following its release in Slovakia, the film opened in July 2009 in the Czech Republic.

Cast 
Attila Mokos as Tono
Roman Luknár as Stefan
Helena Krajčiová as Mária

References

External links 

2009 drama films
2009 films
Sun in a Net Awards winners (films)
Slovak drama films
Slovak-language films